Lost Battalion (aka Escape to Paradise) is a 1960 black-and-white Filipino romantic war film produced and directed by Eddie Romero, and co-produced by Romero and Kane W. Lynn.  Set during World War II, it stars Leopoldo Salcedo, Johnny Monteiro and Diane Jergens. It was later released in the US by American International Pictures as Lost Battalion, on a double feature with Guns of the Black Witch in 1962. The film's ad line read "200 Men and One Girl Trapped in a Ring of Steel!"

Plot 
In the Philippines during World War II, an American major tries to move a guerrilla unit and group of American refugees to the coast, so they can be rescued by submarine, all the while trying to avoid capture by the occupying Japanese forces. Leopoldo Salcedo played the handsome Filipino guerrilla leader who is in love with a stranded American girl Kathy (Diane Jergens).

Cast 
Leopoldo Salcedo as Ramon de Cortes
Diane Jergens as Kathy Hughes
Johnny Monteiro as Bruno
Jennings Sturgeon as Mr. Hughes
Joe Sison as Pepe
Joe Dennis as Col. Landis
Bruce Baxter as Jimmy
Rosi Acosta as Pepe's Wife
Joe Dennis as Landis

Notes

The Philippines were overrun by the Japanese during WW2, and had to resort to guerilla fighting until General Douglas MacArthur made his famous return. The Philippines was liberated in 1945.

This movie also features the main character, Ramon, with Mr. Hughes and his daughter Katherine, both Americans, hiding in a cave and discovered by a primitive band of locals.  These are presumed to be the Aeta people, thought to be the original people of the islands. The Aeta are smaller and darker than most Filipinos, and possess dark curly hair that made the Spanish, when they invaded in the 1500s, label them as "negritos".

References

External links

1960 films
Films directed by Eddie Romero
Philippine black-and-white films
Films set in the Philippines
Pacific War films
Philippine war films
1960s war adventure films
Films shot in the Philippines
American International Pictures films